Dvortsovaya Sludka is a rural locality (a village) in Ust-Kachkinskoye Rural Settlement, Permsky District, Perm Krai, Russia. The population was 15 as of 2010. There are 8 streets.

Geography 
Dvortsovaya Sludka is located 48 km west of Perm (the district's administrative centre) by road. Kachka is the nearest rural locality.

References 

Rural localities in Permsky District